The Belair railway line is a suburban rail commuter route in the city of Adelaide, South Australia, that runs from the Adelaide station to Belair in the Adelaide Hills via the Adelaide-Wolseley line using diesel 3000/3100 class railcars. Prior to 1995, this part of Adelaide-Wolseley was a two-track broad gauge line. In 1995, Adelaide-Wolseley was converted to standard gauge meaning Adelaide to Belair is now effectively two separate single-track lines running in parallel: the Belair commuter line (still broad gauge) and the Adelaide-Wolseley standard gauge freight line.

History
The Adelaide-Wolseley line from Adelaide to Belair and Bridgewater opened in 1883. In 1919, a new alignment was built around Sleeps Hill as part of the duplication of the line. This involved a new double track tunnel being built to replace two tunnels and two viaducts. The new alignment was also  shorter. On 18 June 1928, the line was duplicated from Eden Hills to Blackwood and on to Belair on 24 June 1928.

Passenger services stopped beyond Belair on 23 September 1987. In 1995, the track used by Adelaide bound services was converted to standard gauge as part of the Adelaide to Melbourne standardisation project. The broad gauge passenger services south of Goodwood were thus restricted to one track with crossing loops located at Mitcham, Sleeps Hill, Eden Hills and Blackwood. At the same time, the stations at Millswood, Hawthorn and Clapham were closed to speed up services. Millswood was later reopened on 12 October 2014.

Re-sleepering and electrification 
In 2008, the State Government announced a plan to rebuild the Belair line. The line closed on 26 April 2009 with buses replacing trains. This work saw the track removed, with the track bed and track renewed. Dual gauge sleepers were laid to allow for the line to be converted to standard gauge at a future date. Unlike the other lines this is not planned in the immediate future due to extra engineering work and complications with the standard gauge line. The line reopened on 23 August 2009.

The Belair line was closed from 1 January 2013 to 14 July 2013 to allow electrification of the line from Adelaide to Goodwood (built concurrently with electrification of the adjacent Seaford line) and construction of a grade separation at Goodwood Junction with relatively little work performed on the Belair line itself. In 2021 the new operator of the line, Keolis, enforced the limit on bicycles per carriage, constricting the local Mitcham Hills mountain bike circuit.

Route 
All services are operated by Adelaide Metro's 3000 class railcars. Until June 2007, some services on weekends were operated by a 2000 class railcar modified to incorporate increased bike capacity. In 2005, trains ran the route every 30 minutes on weekdays (hourly after 7pm) and every 60 minutes on weekends and public holidays. From 2006, because of the single line, this was downgraded to every 36/24 minutes on weekdays. In 2018 trains depart at least twice every hour on weekdays, with as little as 10 minutes waiting time during rush hour.

The standard gauge track is owned by the Australian Rail Track Corporation and continues beyond Belair as the Adelaide-Wolseley railway line. The track is used by freight trains operated by One Rail Australia, Pacific National and SCT Logistics, and by the twice-weekly Overland service to Melbourne operated by Journey Beyond.

Line guide

Former stations 
  – opened 1910s, relocated 1917, closed 1995.
  – opened 1910s, closed 1995.
  – opened 1913, closed 2013.
  – closed 1994.
  – opened 2005 for seasonal use, closed 2013.
  – opened 1909, closed 1946.

Gallery

References

External links 
 Belair to City – Adelaide Metro website

Railway lines in South Australia
Railway lines opened in 1883
Transport in Adelaide
5 ft 3 in gauge railways in Australia
25 kV AC railway electrification